Mount Gokurakuji, at  elevation, stands near the city of Hatsukaichi, Hiroshima Prefecture, Japan, and belongs to the Shingon Buddhist sect. The area includes a natural Fir forest where wild bird songs can be heard. The forest has been designated and preserved as a citizen's forest. It is an astonishing tourism site.

References 

Mountains of Hiroshima Prefecture
Shingon Buddhism
Parks and gardens in Hiroshima Prefecture